Peter Robert Livingston (October 3, 1766 – January 19, 1847 Rhinebeck, New York) was an American politician who served as Acting Lieutenant Governor of New York from February to October 1828.

Early life
Peter Robert Livingston was born on October 3, 1766, in New York City.  He was the son of Robert James Livingston (1725–1771) and Susanna (née Smith) Livingston (1729–1791), daughter of Chief Justice William Smith (1728–1793). His brothers were Col. William Smith Livingston (1755–1795) and Judge Maturin Livingston (1769–1847).  They were among the many great-grandchildren of Robert Livingston the Younger (1663–1725), through their grandfather, James Livingston (1701–1763), Younger's eldest son.

Career
Livingston practiced law.  His nephew, Francis Armstrong Livingston (1795–1830), lived with him in Rhinebeck, where Francis had a law office, and until Francis' wedding to Emma Charlotte Kissam in 1817.

He was a member of the New York State Senate (Southern D.) from 1815 to 1822, sitting in the 39th, 40th, 41st, 42nd, 43rd, 44th and 45th New York State Legislatures.

In 1823, he was a member of the New York State Assembly for Dutchess County, and was elected Speaker as a Democratic-Republican/Bucktail, with 117 votes out of 123.

From 1826 to 1829, he was again a member of the State Senate (2nd D.), sitting in the 49th, 50th, 51st and 52nd New York State Legislatures.

In 1828, when Lieutenant Governor Nathaniel Pitcher succeeded to the governorship after the death of Gov. DeWitt Clinton, Livingston was elected President pro tempore of the State Senate and became Acting Lieutenant Governor of New York.

He was a delegate to the Whig National Convention from New York in 1839 where he served as Convention Vice-president.

Personal life
He married his cousin, Joanna Livingston (1759–1827), the ninth child of Judge Robert Livingston (1718–1775) and Margaret (née Beekman) Livingston (1724–1800).  She was the sister of Chancellor Robert R. Livingston (1746–1813), a member of the Committee of Five that drafted the Declaration of Independence, and Edward Livingston (1764-1836), a U.S. Senator and the 11th U.S. Secretary of State.  They had no children.

He was originally buried at the Dutch Reformed Church in Rhinebeck, but later reinterred at an unknown location.

References
Notes

Sources
Jabez Delano Hammond: The History of Political Parties in the State of New York (Baltimore, 1850)
 Political Graveyard

1766 births
1847 deaths
Lieutenant Governors of New York (state)
New York (state) state senators
Speakers of the New York State Assembly
Peter R
American people of Scottish descent